Elections to Rugby Borough Council were held on 2 May 2002.  The whole council was up for election as a result of the boundary changes that had taken place since the last election in 2000. The council stayed under no overall control.

Election result

|}

Ward results

References

2002 English local elections
2002
2000s in Warwickshire